Johan Peter Mikael Rangmar (November 10, 1956 – May 25, 1997) was a Swedish comedian, actor, baritone, writer and television personality who was best known as a member of Galenskaparna och After Shave.

Biography
Born in Annelund, Rangmar attended the Chalmers University of Technology where he majored in mechanical engineering. After completing his education, he became one of the primary founders of the barbershop quartet After Shave along with Jan Rippe, Knut Agnred and Per Fritzell. In 1982, the group merged with the comedy group Galenskaparna, becoming Galenskaparna och After Shave. They appeared in the television show Macken.

As an actor, Rangmar often portrayed temperamental or nervous characters. He has starred in several films alongside Galenskaparna och After Shave such as Leif and The Shark Who Knew Too Much. As a voice actor, Rangmar provided the voice of Timon in the Swedish-Language version of the animated film The Lion King. One of his last major film performances was in The Little Jönsson Gang and the Cornflakes Heist.

Death
In 1994, Rangmar was diagnosed with melanoma, and kept the details about his illness fairly subtle, and received treatment. He was set to be the host of Melodifestivalen 1997, but Janne Jingryd hosted instead. He died on May 25, 1997, at the age of 40 years old.

Filmography

Cinema
The Castle Tour – Guide
Leif – Inspector Mård / Taxi driver / Bishop
The Lion King – Timon
The Little Jönsson Gang and the Cornflakes Heist – Sigvard Jönsson
Monopol – Sune Finåker
Peter Pan - Cubby Bear (1992 dub)
The Shark Who Knew Too Much – Lennart Cumberland-Brons

Television
Macken

References

External links

1956 births
1997 deaths
People from Herrljunga Municipality
Swedish male stage actors
Swedish male film actors
Swedish male television actors
Swedish male voice actors
Swedish male comedians
Swedish television directors
Swedish television personalities
Swedish baritones
20th-century Swedish male actors
20th-century Swedish male singers
20th-century Swedish comedians
Galenskaparna och After Shave members
Chalmers University of Technology alumni
Deaths from cancer in Sweden
Deaths from melanoma